Rudnica  is a village in the administrative district of Gmina Stoszowice, within Ząbkowice Śląskie County, Lower Silesian Voivodeship, in south-western Poland.

References

Rudnica